Rick Vandivier (born October 18, 1954) is an American jazz guitarist. He is the leader of the group Vandivier and the co-founder and lead guitarist of Primary Colors, a group that includes vocalist Nate Pruitt.

Music career
Vandivier is a graduate of Berklee College of Music in Boston. and San Jose State University where he teaches guitar. In his formative years, in addition to private studies with Pat Metheny and Mick Goodrick, Vandivier took master classes with Christopher Parkening, Rey De La Torre, Michael Lorimer, Michael Hedges, Tuck Andress, and Manuel Barrueco.

His performing career has been highlighted by performances at Carnegie Hall, the Great American Music Hall, and the Berlin Jazz Festival in addition to the North Sea Jazz Festival in The Hague, Abidjan (Ivory Coast, Africa) the Lyric Opera of Chicago, the Wilshire Theater in Los Angeles, the Berklee Performance Center in Boston, and the American Conservatory Theater in San Francisco, the Seattle Opera House, and the Metropolitan Museum of Art. Artists he has performed with include Smith Dobson, Albert "Tootie" Heath, Bruce Forman, John Handy, Mose Allison, David Grisman, Richie Cole, and Dr. Lonnie Smith. He has also performed with the orchestras of the American Musical Theater of San Jose, Opera San Jose, and TheatreWorks.

Vandivier and Nate Pruitt achieved growing recognition in the 1980s in A Little Night Music, a South Bay sextet led by keyboardist Ed Manning. That group appeared at a number of international jazz festivals and recorded two albums - Late One Night (1983) (includes Matt Finders and Tuck and Patti) and Sitting Ducks (1985).

Another musical pairing solidified into a group called Threesome with bassist Benny Rietveld, best known for his work with Santana and Miles Davis. In 1994 they took the name Primary Colors and recorded the band's 1999 debut album We Know How It Feels (Avatar Productions).

Selected discography
 1983 Late One Night - A Little Night Music
 1985 Sitting Ducks - A Little Night Music
 1994 House of Doors - Ed Johnson
 2000 We Know How It Feels - Primary Colors
 2002 Over That Wave - Ed Johnson
 2003 Every Mother's Son - Primary Colors
 2004 Spirit of the Room - Rick Vandivier with John Stowell
 2007 Birds in Flight - Kat Parra
 2007 Vagabundeo - Alexa Weber Morales
 2008 Azucar De Amor - Kat Parra
 2008 Vandivier - Rick Vandivier
 2012 More Than One Way Home - Primary Colors

References

External links
 Official site
 Primary Colors
  Vandivier Video Clip

Living people
1954 births
American jazz guitarists
20th-century American guitarists